Jacobo Majluta Azar (9 October 1934 – 2 March 1996) was Vice President of the Dominican Republic from 16 August 1978 to 4 July 1982. He was one of the generations of politicians in the Dominican Republic whose ambition was continually thwarted by the country's labyrinthine power struggles and sectarianism.

Biography
Born in 1934 into a merchant family of Lebanese origin, Majluta studied finance at the Universidad Autónoma de Santo Domingo before working as an accountant in the banking and state sectors. He married Ana Elisa Villanueva on April 17, 1962. The couple had one daughter, Consuelo Elena.

Majluta joined the Dominican Revolutionary Party (PRD) in 1961, in the wake of the dictator Leonidas Trujillo's assassination, and rose quickly, becoming the youngest minister in Juan Bosch's short-lived government of 1963. He was Minister of Finance. When it was overthrown by a military coup later that year, Majluta went into exile, returning to rebuild his political career and winning the PRD's vice-presidential nomination for the 1978 elections.

In power, Majluta was out of sympathy with the PRD's more radical social-democratic wing. As head of CORDE, one of the large state-sector companies, he was also allegedly involved in corruption, although charges were never proven. His real concern, however, was to beat off the challenge of rival caudillos or strongmen within the PRD, and this struggle dominated the rest of his career.

After Guzmán's suicide, Majluta hoped to win the PRD's presidential nomination, but lost out to Salvador Jorge Blanco. When Jorge Blanco won the 1982 elections, Majluta became president of the senate, using his position to side with the opposition and block his rival's policy program. As Jorge Blanco's administration gradually slid into bankruptcy and scandal, Majluta again aimed for the PRD's nomination. This time, however, he faced the formidable José Francisco Peña Gómez, and open war broke out between the two men's factions. After several rival supporters were killed in shoot- outs, Majluta finally grabbed the nomination for 1986.
Despite his considerable political skills, Majluta lost in the elections that year to Joaquín Balaguer, the old Caudillo of Dominican politics. Balaguer defeated Majluta by a narrow margin to return to the presidency at the age of 80. The brutal in-fighting which had won Majluta the PRD ticket had also alienated a large section of the party, and many of the PRD faithful voted against their own candidate.

Majluta did not enhance his standing by claiming victory as soon as voting ended and by demanding a rerun of the election. In the end a series of meetings with emissaries from the military and Church forced him to accept defeat.

Post-presidency
In 1987, Majluta was expelled from the PRD as Peña Gómez reasserted his influence, but an electoral court ruled the move illegal. In 1989, he left to form his own Independent Revolutionary Party (PRI), an organization geared specifically towards his own electoral aspirations. The PRI never gained genuine popular support, but the 7 per cent it won in the 1990 election was enough to undermine Peña Gómez's chances.

Ironically, in the weeks before his death, Majluta had sought a rapprochement with his old rival and had even endorsed Peña Gómez's candidature for the forthcoming May elections. It was an uncharacteristic gesture on the part of a hard-nosed, cynical fighter who always valued personal power far higher than party democracy.

He died in 1996 in Tampa, Florida of lung cancer.

References

|-

|-

1934 births
1996 deaths
Deaths from lung cancer
People from Santo Domingo
Presidents of the Dominican Republic
Vice presidents of the Dominican Republic
Finance ministers of the Dominican Republic
Members of the Senate of the Dominican Republic
Presidents of the Senate of the Dominican Republic
Dominican Revolutionary Party politicians
Independent Revolutionary Party politicians
Presidents of political parties in the Dominican Republic
Members of the Greek Orthodox Church of Antioch